Megabothris is a genus of fleas belonging to the family Ceratophyllidae.

The species of this genus are found in Eurasia and Northern America.

Species:
 Megabothris abantis (Rothschild, 1905) 
 Megabothris acerbus (Jordan, 1925)

References

Ceratophyllidae
Siphonaptera genera